Earnest Sylvestor Long (October 11, 1927 – September 20, 2000), nicknamed "The Kid", was an American Negro league pitcher for the Chattanooga Choo-Choos and Cleveland Buckeyes between 1945 and 1950.

A native of Chattanooga, Tennessee, Long was selected to the West squad for the 1949 East–West All-Star Game. He died in Rome, Georgia in 2000 at age 72.

References

External links
 and Seamheads
 Ernest Long at Negro Leagues Baseball Museum

1927 births
2000 deaths
Cleveland Buckeyes players
Sportspeople from Chattanooga, Tennessee
Baseball players from Tennessee
20th-century African-American sportspeople
Baseball pitchers